"Message personnel" is a song by Françoise Hardy from her 1973 album Message personnel. It was also released as a single.

Writing and composition 
 Françoise Hardy: Title of the song and words of the spoken part.
 Michel Berger: Lyrics and music of the sung part.
 The recording was produced by Michel Berger.

Track listing 
7" single Warner Bros. 16 331 (1973)
1. "Message personnel" (4:15)
2. "Première rencontre" (2:50)

Charts

Cover versions 
The song has been covered by Michel Berger himself, France Gall, Isabelle Huppert (in the 2002 film 8 Women), Jenifer, Willeke Alberti (in Dutch under the title "Als je komt dan zal ik thuis zijn"), Heather Nova, Lara Fabian, Julie Pietri, Véronique Sanson, Barbara Carlotti & Dominique A.

Françoise Hardy also recorded an English version, titled also "Message personnel".

References 

Françoise Hardy songs
France Gall songs
Jenifer (singer) songs
Lara Fabian songs
French pop songs
Song recordings produced by Michel Berger
Songs written by Michel Berger
Songs written by Françoise Hardy